Coffman is an unincorporated community and coal town located in Ohio County, Kentucky, United States. It was also known as Jimtown.  Founded in 1905 by Franklin Olliver Coffman, it included a post office, school, and general store.  Mining ceased in 1911 when cheaper shallow strip mining in Indiana began operations.

References

Unincorporated communities in Ohio County, Kentucky
Unincorporated communities in Kentucky
Coal towns in Kentucky